Westbury Secondary School or Westbury High School is a secondary school in Westbury, Johannesburg, South Africa.

In 2014 officials from the South African Police Service (SAPS) and the Gauteng Department of Education raided the school to combat illegal drugs. K9 units were used to search for drugs. ENCA wrote that "Westbury has been  as a gangsterism hot spot".

References

High schools in South Africa
Schools in Johannesburg